Tamami Nakada (born 21 December 1997) is a Japanese professional basketball player for JX-Eneos Sunflowers and the Japanese national team.

She represented Japan at the 2021 FIBA Women's Asia Cup, where the team won the gold medal.

References

External links

1997 births
Living people
Centers (basketball)
Japanese women's basketball players
Sportspeople from Saitama (city)
Competitors at the 2019 Summer Universiade
21st-century Japanese women